Raymond Thomas Johnston (December 31, 1914 – March 16, 1989) was a Canadian merchant and politician in Quebec. He represented Pontiac in the Legislative Assembly of Quebec (later the National Assembly of Quebec) from 1948 to 1970 as a Union Nationale member.

The son of Robert Johnston, a merchant, and Theresa Coghlan, he was born in Waltham. He was educated there, in Chapeau, in Westmeath, Ontario, at St. Patrick's College in Ottawa and at the Ottawa normal school. In 1935, he obtained a teaching certificate for the province of Ontario. From 1941 to 1946, he served with the Canadian Forestry Corps.

From 1935 to 1938, Johnston worked for the Canadian International Paper Company in Témiscaming. He was co-owner of the Johnston Brothers general store from 1938 to 1967. He was also a lumber merchant.

From 1946 to 1972, Johnston was vice-president of the Clapham school board. He served as a municipal councillor for Otter Lake from 1947 to 1977. He was also a member of the school board for Pontiac and served as vice-president of the board.

He was elected to the Quebec assembly in 1948 and was reelected in 1952, 1956, 1960, 1962 and 1966. Johnston served as assistant party whip and as parliamentary assistant to the Minister of Hunting and Fishing. He was Revenue Minister from 1966 to 1970. Johnston was defeated when he ran for reelection in 1970.

He served as district governor for the Royal Canadian Legion. He was also named a knight in the Order of St. Gregory the Great.

In 1941, he married Grace Camilla Bowie.

Johnston died in Shawville at the age of 74.

References 

1914 births
1989 deaths
Union Nationale (Quebec) MNAs
Knights of St. Gregory the Great